Joaquim Mascarenhas de Fiúza (8 February 1908 – 4 March 2010) was a Portuguese sailor who competed in three Olympic games in 1936, 1948 and 1952. He was born in São Domingos de Benfica. At the Berlin Games he was placed 10th in the men's Star class sailing competition, alongside António Guedes de Herédia. In London he improved his performance to 6th in the same event, alongside Júlio de Sousa Leite Gourinho. In Helsinki, he won the bronze medal in the event alongside Francisco de Andrade. In 2008 he turned 100 and was recognized as Portugal's oldest living former Olympian.

References

1908 births
2010 deaths
Portuguese centenarians
Portuguese male sailors (sport)
Olympic sailors of Portugal
Sailors at the 1936 Summer Olympics – Star
Sailors at the 1948 Summer Olympics – Star
Sailors at the 1952 Summer Olympics – Star
Olympic bronze medalists for Portugal
Olympic medalists in sailing
Sportspeople from Lisbon
Medalists at the 1952 Summer Olympics
Men centenarians